The Tainan City Council (TNCC) is the elected municipal council of Tainan City, Republic of China that the council is composed of 57 councilors elected from Single non-transferable vote for four-year terms to oversees the Tainan City Government. The Speaker and the Deputy Speaker of the Council are chosen by fellow councilors through anonymous voting. All councilors are directly elected by citizens of the city. Citizen aged 23 or above, who has resided in this city for more than four months.

Organization
Speaker 
Deputy Speaker
Secretary-General
Deputy Secretary-General
Committees
Committee of Civil Affairs 
Committee of Finance 
Committee of Education 
Committee of Construction 
Committee of Security 
Committee of Public Works 
Committee of Discipline

Speakers

 Lai Mei-hui (Dec. 25th, 2010 - Dec. 24th, 2014)
 Lee Chuan-chiao (Dec. 25th, 2014 - Aug. 30th, 2016)
 Kuo Hsin-liang (Aug. 30th - Oct. 5th, 2016) (acting)
 Lai Mei-hui (5 October 2016 - Dec. 24th, 2018)
 Kuo Hsin-liang (Independent) (Dec. 25, 2018 -)

See also
 Mayor of Tainan
 Tainan City Government

References

External links